Si-Kunda Forest Park is a forest park in the Gambia. Established on January 1, 1954, it covers 445 hectares. 

It is located in the Central River area at an estimated altitude of 18 meters.

References

Protected areas established in 1954
Forest parks of the Gambia